Hermann Martin Asmuss (31 May 1812 – 6 December 1859) was a Baltic German paleozoologist and professor at the Imperial University of Dorpat.

Asmuss was born in Dorpat, present-day Estonia, as the son of writer Johann Martin Asmuss and Christine Luise Asmuss, née Luhde. He studied at the Imperial University of Dorpat and received his doctorate from the Albertus University of Königsberg. In 1857 he was made full professor and director of the "Cabinet of natural history" at Tartu university. His main field of work lay in classifying Hemiptera. The lizard species Saara asmussi is named after him.

In 1856 he published Das vollkommenste Hautskelet der bisher bekannten Thierreihe.

References

1812 births
1859 deaths
Scientists from Tartu
People from Kreis Dorpat
Baltic-German people
Estonian paleontologists
German paleontologists
Paleozoologists
Estonian zoologists
19th-century German zoologists
University of Tartu alumni
University of Königsberg alumni
Academic staff of the University of Tartu